Daredevil's Reward is a 1928 American silent Western film directed by Eugene Forde and written by John Stone. The film stars Tom Mix, Natalie Joyce, Lawford Davidson, Billy Bletcher, Harry Cording, and William Welsh. The film was released on January 15, 1928, by Fox Film Corporation.

Cast
 Tom Mix as Tom Hardy
 Natalie Joyce as Ena Powell
 Lawford Davidson as Foster
 Billy Bletcher as Slim
 Harry Cording as Second Heavy
 William Welsh as James Powell

See also
 Tom Mix filmography
 1937 Fox vault fire

References

External links
 
 

1928 films
Fox Film films
1928 Western (genre) films
Films directed by Eugene Forde
American black-and-white films
Silent American Western (genre) films
1920s English-language films
1920s American films